A dolly is an unpowered vehicle designed for connection to a tractor unit, truck or prime mover vehicle with strong traction power.

United States

Classification by axle configuration

There are several types of dolly bogie:

 Full trailer - 2 axle (4 wheels), with a draw bar which also controls the trailer's front axle steering. The draw bar does not take load of the full trailer. Heavy full trailer needs to have its own brakes remotely controlled by the prime mover vehicle.
 Semi-trailer - 1 axle (2 wheels), without the front axle but have a landing gear. Large semi-trailer of truck size is designed for connection via the fifth wheel on the tractor unit or the semi-trailer truck. Small semi-trailer such as travel trailer and boat trailer is designed for connection via a tow hitch of a passenger vehicle. Either the fifth wheel or the tow hitch takes up to half the load of the semi-trailer.
 Road train - special large dolly bogie equipped with a fifth wheel for further connection by the gooseneck type drawbar of another similar dolly and form a road train. The last dolly in a road train needs its own rear lights, brakes remotely controlled by the prime mover vehicle, and registration plate.
 Tow dolly - a semi-trailer designed as automobile rescue equipment. It is designed to couple to the concerned automobile's powered wheel, i.e. the front wheel of a Front-wheel drive automobile, or the rear wheel of a rear-wheel drive automobile, by locking the powered wheels onto the tow dolly's tray. The tow dolly is tow hitch connected to a tractor or truck. Tow dollies are legal in all 50 US states and Canada. In the U.S. and Canada brakes are required on any loaded car tow dolly.

Classification by coupling configuration

There are two basic types:
 Converter dolly, equipped with between one and three axles and designed to connect to a towbar on the rear of the truck or trailer in front. There are two variants of this:
 An A-dolly has a single drawbar with a centred coupling.
 A C-dolly has two separate couplings side-by-side.
 Low loader dolly, equipped with a gooseneck type drawbar that attaches to the fifth wheel coupling on the rear of a prime mover to distribute the mass on the fifth wheel on the dolly between the prime mover and the wheels of the dolly. These are predominantly fitted with two axles.

Australia
Converter dollies are used in road trains in Australia, most commonly with two or three axles and a hinged drawbar.  They are also frequently referred to as road train dollies.

The C-dolly design is not allowed in Australia, as it prevents articulation between the dolly wheels and the axles of the truck or trailer in front of the dolly. Australian rules require articulation between axle groups.

Low-loader dollies – which present a kingpin rather than a drawbar coupling – are used with many low loaders to allow heavy cargo to be carried without overloading the wheels of the prime mover or the low loader.

Airport dolly 

Dollies are used for the transportation of loose baggages, oversized bags, mail bags, loose cargo carton boxes, etc. between an aircraft and the terminal or sorting facility. In the US, these dollies are called baggage carts, but in Europe baggage cart means baggage trolleys used by individual passengers.

See also

 Axle track
 Boat dolly
 Flatbed trolley
 Road train
 Roll trailer
 Wheelbase

References

External links 
 Diagrams of A-dolly & C-dolly.
 Evaluation of dollies, University of Michigan
 Legal definition of a dolly in Oregon, USA
 Images of trailer dollies

Trucks